The 2010–11 Ukrainian Premier League season was the 20th since its establishment and third since its reorganization. Shakhtar Donetsk were the defending champions, having won their 5th league title. A total of sixteen teams participated in the competition, fourteen of them contested the 2009–10 season while the remaining two were promoted from the Ukrainian First League.

The competition began on 9 July 2010 with four games. After the 19th Round, the competition was suspended for the winter break and resumed on 3 March 2011.

On 6 May 2011, Shakhtar Donetsk retained the championship with a 2–0 derby victory over rivals Metalurh Donetsk.

The top five teams were exactly the same as the previous season.

Teams

Promoted
FC Sevastopol, champion of the 2009-10 Ukrainian First League – (debut)
FC Volyn Lutsk, runner-up of the 2009-10 Ukrainian First League – (returning after absence of 4 seasons)

Location map

Managers and captains

Managerial changes

Stadiums

Attendance 

The total attendance for the season was 2,214,833. The most watched team was Shakhtar Donetsk with 722,231 spectators. The least watched team was Arsenal Kyiv with 153,339 spectators.

Qualification to European competitions for 2011–12
 Since Ukraine finished in seventh place of the UEFA country ranking after the 2009–10 season, the league will have the same number of qualifiers for 2011–12 UEFA Europa League. The Ukrainian Cup winner qualifies for the play-off round.

Qualified teams
 After the 22nd Round, Shakhtar Donetsk qualified for European football for the 2011–12 season.
 After the 25th Round, both Dynamo Kyiv and Metalist Kharkiv qualified for European football for the 2011–12 season.
 After the 26th Round, Shakhtar Donetsk qualified for 2011–12 UEFA Champions League.
 After the 26th Round, both Dnipro Dnipropetrovsk and Karpaty Lviv qualified for European football for the 2011–12 season.
 After the 27th Round, Karpaty Lviv qualified for 2011–12 UEFA Europa League.

 After the 28th Round, Shakhtar Donetsk qualified for 2011–12 UEFA Champions League Group stage (C) and Dynamo Kyiv qualified for 2011–12 UEFA Champions League Third qualifying round.
 After the 28th Round, both Dnipro Dnipropetrovsk and Metalist Kharkiv qualified for 2011–12 UEFA Europa League.
 After the results of the semi-finals of the Ukrainian Cup, Metalist Kharkiv enters the 2011–12 UEFA Europa League in the Play-off round.

 After the 29th Round, Dnipro Dnipropetrovsk enters the 2011–12 UEFA Europa League in the Play-off round and Karpaty Lviv enters in the Third qualifying round.
 After the 30th Round, Vorskla Poltava qualified for the 2011–12 UEFA Europa League and enters Second qualifying round.

League table

Results

Round by round

Top goalscorers

The top ten goalscorers during the season.

Awards

Season awards
The laureates of the 2010–11 UPL season were:
 Best player:  Willian (Shakhtar Donetsk)
 Best coach:  Mircea Lucescu (Shakhtar Donetsk)
 Best goalkeeper:  Oleksandr Shovkovskyi (Dynamo Kyiv)
 Best arbiter:  Viktor Shvetsov (Odesa)
 Best young player:  Yevhen Konoplyanka (Dnipro Dnipropetrovsk)
 Best goalscorer:  Yevhen Seleznyov (Dnipro Dnipropetrovsk)

See also 
2010–11 Ukrainian First League
2010–11 Ukrainian Premier League Reserves
2010–11 Ukrainian Second League
2010–11 Ukrainian Cup
2010–11 UEFA Europa League
Transfers
Transfer window regulations for the Ukrainian championship is unclear
List of Ukrainian football transfers summer 2010
List of Ukrainian football transfers winter 2010–2011

References 

Ukrainian Premier League seasons
1